A Good Hanging and Other Stories is a collection of short stories by crime writer Ian Rankin.

The collection features Ian Rankin's popular Detective Inspector Rebus.  The collection is of 12 short stories set in Edinburgh, where Ian Rankin sets almost all of his novels.

These twelve Rebus stories cover a chronological year in his life; "Playback" in March, "A Good Hanging" in August during the Festival Fringe and "Auld Lang Syne" in December.

The Short Stories:

References 

Works by Ian Rankin
1992 short story collections
Scottish short story collections
Century (imprint) books